Virendra Kumar Sharma (Hindi: ,; born 5 April 1947) is a British-Indian Labour Party politician. He has been the Member of Parliament (MP) for Ealing Southall since winning the seat at a by-election in 2007.

In 2023, to celebrate 75 years of India's independence, the British Council’s India/UK Together’s Season of Culture organised the India UK Achievers Honours in partnership with the National Indian Students and Alumni Union UK (NISAU) to recognise the work of 75 young achievers, 8 outstanding achievers, 3 living legends and one lifetime achiever, who have been educated in the UK. Sharma has been awarded as a living legend at the India UK Achievers Honours.

Early life and background
Virendra Kumar Sharma was born on 5 April 1947 in Mandhali, Nawanshahr in the Punjab Province of British India (now Mandhali, Shaheed Bhagat Singh Nagar district, Punjab, India) into a Punjabi Hindu Brahmin family and received his education at the London School of Economics on a trade union scholarship.

In addition to English, Sharma is fluent in his native Indian languages of Hindi and Punjabi.

Sharma came to Hanwell, Ealing, West London from India in 1968 and became a bus conductor on the 207 route, later working as a day services manager for people with learning disabilities in Hillingdon. He began his political career by joining the Liberal Party, then switched to Labour. He was Race Equalities Officer to the Labour Party nationally.

He was a councillor in the London Borough of Ealing from 1982 to 2010 and became Mayor. He was criticised for his low attendance and stood down as a councillor at the 2010 local elections.

Parliamentary career
Virendra Sharma was elected as MP in the Ealing Southall by-election, held on 19 July 2007. The by-election was called following the death of the sitting Labour MP, Piara Khabra, on 19 June 2007. Sharma held the seat at the 2010 General Election. As a new MP in 2008, Sharma signed a letter drafted by Keith Vaz on behalf of Shahrokh Mireskandari, for which Vaz was criticised for not declaring his relationship with the family. Sharma said that Vaz had not informed him of the relationship and that he would "be more questioning before I sign a letter in future".

In November 2008, the Labour government gave Sharma the role of Parliamentary Private Secretary to the Minister of State at the Treasury and Home Office, Phil Woolas, who had responsibility for borders and immigration. Sharma resigned from this post in January 2009 in opposition to the Labour government's proposal to build a third runway at Heathrow Airport.

Sharma is a member of the parliamentary select committees on Health, Human Rights and International Development. He has made official overseas visits as an MP to Cyprus, Kenya, regions of India, Mauritius and South Korea. He is vice-chair of the All-Party Parliamentary Group for British-Hindus. He supported David Miliband in the 2010 Labour leadership election.

In 2016, in a reversal of his previous stance, Sharma announced that he now supported Heathrow expansion.

In 2017, Sharma voted against the bill on triggering Article 50 in the House of Commons, expressing his concern over Brexit's potential effects on the economy.

In 2019, Sharma lost a vote of no-confidence at his Constituency Labour Party: the reasons given by opponents were his low attendance at party meetings, slow response to constituents communications and unwillingness to campaign against toxic emissions from the redevelopment of the Old Gasworks site (Southall Waterside).

Personal life
Sharma is a British-Indian, a British-Punjabi and a British-Hindu. He has been married to Nirmala Sharma since 1968. They have a son and daughter and three grandchildren.

He has been the vice-chair of APPG for British-Hindus. He is currently a school governor at the Three Bridges and Wolf Fields schools.

References

External links
Virendra Sharma site

UK Parliament Website: details of Sharma's parliamentary expenses
'Ealing Times' newspaper column written by Sharma and other Ealing MPs until 2008
UK Polling Report: Ealing Southall profile including detail on Sharma

1947 births
Living people
Punjabi people
Indian Hindus
Punjabi Hindus
Punjabi Brahmins
People from Punjab, India
People from Shaheed Bhagat Singh Nagar district
Punjab, India politicians
Indian emigrants to the United Kingdom
Indian emigrants to England
People from Hanwell
People from Southall
People from Ealing
People from London
British people of Indian descent
British people of Punjabi descent
British Hindus
English people of Indian descent
English people of Punjabi descent
English Hindus
British politicians of Indian descent
British politicians of Punjabi descent
Politicians from London
Labour Party (UK) MPs for English constituencies
UK MPs 2005–2010
UK MPs 2010–2015
UK MPs 2015–2017
UK MPs 2017–2019
UK MPs 2019–present
Alumni of the London School of Economics
Councillors in Greater London
Councillors in the London Borough of Ealing